Eric Archdale Tayler (4 December 1921 – 6 August 1997) was a New Zealand-born television producer, director and actor, best known for his work for the BBC in the United Kingdom and the ABC in Australia.

Biography
Tayler was born in Hamilton, New Zealand, and educated at Auckland Grammar School. He served in the New Zealand Army during World War II as part of the second New Zealand Expeditionary Force.

In 1947, Tayler moved to London, where he attended the Royal Academy of Dramatic Art (RADA) from 1947 to 1950, which was where he met his wife, Welsh-Australian actress Lyn James, with whom he had two children. In 1955, Tayler joined the drama department of the BBC, working on such programmes as Maigret, Z-Cars and a 1962 adaptation of Oliver Twist. In 1965, Tayler joined the Australian Broadcasting Commission as a producer, where he produced several drama series including Contrabandits.

References

External links

1921 births
1997 deaths
New Zealand television producers
New Zealand television directors
People educated at Auckland Grammar School
Alumni of RADA
BBC television producers
New Zealand expatriates in the United Kingdom
New Zealand emigrants to Australia
New Zealand military personnel of World War II
People from Hamilton, New Zealand